The Left Democratic Front is the name of a political alliance in Maharashtra, India. The core of LDF in Maharashtra is Communist Party of India (Marxist), Communist Party of India and the Peasants and Workers Party of India.

References

Ambedkarite organisations
Defunct communist parties in India
Defunct political parties in Maharashtra
Defunct political party alliances in India
Farmers' rights activists